Leave Her to Heaven is a 1940 play by the British writer John Van Druten. Actress Ruth Chatterton made her first appearance on Broadway in 15 years. She co-starred with Edmond O'Brien. It premiered at the Longacre Theatre on Broadway on 27 February 1940. Set in England, it was based on a true story about a woman who took her older husband's chauffeur as a lover, only for the younger man to kill her husband.

It is unrelated to the film of the same title, which is based on a 1944 novel by Ben Ames Williams.

References

Bibliography
 Gerald Bordman. American Theatre: A Chronicle of Comedy and Drama, 1930-1969. Oxford University Press, 1996.
 Scott O'Brien. Ruth Chatterton, Actress, Aviator, Author. BearManor Media, 2013.
 Derek Sculthorpe. Edmond O'Brien: Everyman of Film Noir. McFarland, 2018.

1940 plays
Plays by John Van Druten
Plays set in London